is an underground railway station in Miyagino-ku in Sendai, Miyagi Prefecture, Japan, operated by the East Japan Railway Company (JR East).

Lines

Station layout
The station is an underground station with one island platform serving two tracks.

Platforms

History
Tsutsujigaoka Station opened on June 5, 1925, as a station on the Miyagi Electric Railway. The line was nationalized on May 1, 1944. The station was absorbed into the JR East network upon the privatization of JNR on April 1, 1987. The station was relocated underground in 1991.

Passenger statistics
In fiscal 2018, the station was used by an average of 3,295 passengers daily (boarding passengers only).

Surrounding area
 Tsutsujigaoka Park
 Tsutsujigaoka Post Office

See also
 List of railway stations in Japan

References

External links

  

Railway stations in Sendai
Senseki Line
Railway stations in Japan opened in 1925
Stations of East Japan Railway Company